Edward Lynch or Ed Lynch may refer to:

Ed Lynch (Florida politician) (born 1965), American businessman and Republican politician
Ed Lynch (baseball) (born 1956), American retired professional baseball player
Ed Lynch (cyclist) (born 1929), American Olympic cyclist
Eddie Lynch (1896–1967), American professional football player
Eddie Lynch (American football coach), American collegiate football player and coach
Edward Francis Lynch (1897–1980), Australian World War I veteran and author